Terézia Poliaková (born 2 April 1989) is a Slovak former biathlete.

Career
She competed at the 2013 and 2015 World Championships, and at the 2014 and 2018 Winter Olympics.

Record

Olympic Games

World Championships

References

External links
 

1989 births
Living people
Sportspeople from Brezno
Slovak female biathletes
Biathletes at the 2014 Winter Olympics
Biathletes at the 2018 Winter Olympics
Olympic biathletes of Slovakia